Class 86 may refer to:

British Rail Class 86 – a class of standard British electric locomotives
DRG Class 86 – a class of standard German steam 2-8-2T locomotives

See also
 Type 86 (disambiguation)